Richard Potter (1783–1835) was an American magician, hypnotist and ventriloquist. He was the first American-born magician to gain fame in his own country and is widely considered the first African-American celebrity.

Biography
Potter was born in Hopkinton, Massachusetts;. He claimed his father was Sir Charles Henry Frankland, a tax collector for the Port of Boston and that his mother Dinah was a black slave in the household. Since Sir Charles died in England in 1768, others believe the father may have been Henry Cromwell who lived in the household or a minister by the name of George Simpson.

Richard Potter became a well-known magician in the New England area from 1811 to his death in 1834. As a performer he obscured most of his early life and encouraged speculation. Evidently he went to Hopkinton schools. Various accounts differ on the reason but agree that he went to Europe and joined John Rannie, a Scottish ventriloquist and magician. Rannie came to the United States in 1800.

Potter toured with Rannie as one of his assistants in the Eastern United States.  In 1811 Rannie retired to Scotland and encouraged Potter to continue on his own. This is also the year that he became a Mason of African Lodge No. 459 and was part of founding the Prince Hall Masonry. Potter performed up and down the East Coast, going as far south as Alabama. One of Potter's notable run-ins with prejudice occurred in Mobile, Alabama, where he was turned away from a hotel because of his race. Despite this issue, Potter still made over $4,000 during that visit.

In 1814 Potter purchased about 175 acres in the village of Andover, New Hampshire.  He built a large house on his estate. Known for his showmanship in all aspects of life, the estate included two life size wooden carvings of human figures on pillars.  To this day, this area of New Hampshire is called "Potter Place" for Richard.

Potter inspired Grace Metalious's character Samuel Peyton in the novel Peyton Place.

Potter married Sally Harris in 1808.  Potter claimed she was a Penobscot Native American.  They had three children.   Richard and Sally are buried in a small graveyard on the property he bought in Andover. Their graves were moved but his  request was to be buried upright.

See also 
New Hampshire Historical Marker No. 54: Potter Place

References

Bibliography
 History of the Town of Andover New Hampshire, 1791–1906. Prepared by John R. Eastman. Concord nh:Rumford Printing Company, 1910
 MAGIC A Pictorial History, by David Price, 1985 
 The Enchanting Story of Richard Potter, America's First Famous Black American Magician and Ventriloquist, by Mary Lyons West, 2019. 
 The Illustrated History of Magic, by Milbourne Christopher, 1973.

External links 
 Online History of Richard Potter and Potter Place, New Hampshire

1783 births
1835 deaths
American magicians
Freemasonry
People from Hopkinton, Massachusetts
People from Andover, New Hampshire